In the Wake of a Stranger is a 1959 British thriller film directed by David Eady and starring Tony Wright, Shirley Eaton and Danny Green. In the film, a group of murderers try to frame an innocent sailor, Tom Cassidy (Tony Wright), for their crime.

Cast
 Tony Wright - Tom Cassidy 
 Shirley Eaton - Joyce Edwards 
 Danny Green - Barnes 
 Willoughby Goddard - Shafto 
 Harry H. Corbett - McCabe 
 Tom Bowman - Spike 
 Alun Owen - Ferris 
 Barbara Archer - Barmaid 
 Vanda Godsell - Hetty McCabe 
 James Ottaway - Johnson 
 Peter Sinclair - Sea Captain 
 Peter Carver - Lorry Driver 
 Frank Pemberton - Landlord 
 Patricia Dean - Secretary 
 David Hemmings - Schoolboy

Critical reception
TV Guide gave the film two out of five stars, writing, "The plot is confusing and often illogical, and the love story only gets in the way of the mystery"; and Leonard Maltin gave the film two out of four stars, calling it, "just fair."

References

External links

1959 films
British thriller films
1950s thriller films
Films directed by David Eady
1950s English-language films
1950s British films